The Nightingale Mountains are a north–south trending range located along the western border of Pershing County and extending into the northeastern corner of Washoe County.

The site of Nightingale and its large tungsten mine (abandoned in the 1950s) are at the southern end of the east slope.  The area also has deposits of arsenic and antimony ore which were mined during World War I and World War II.

The Nightingale Mountains are named for Alanson W. Nightingill who was Captain of Company C during the 1860 Paiute War and later the first state controller of Nevada.

References

Mountain ranges of Pershing County, Nevada
Mountain ranges of Washoe County, Nevada
Mountain ranges of Nevada